Zhujiayu is a village in Guanzhuang Subdistrict, Zhangqiu, Jinan, Shandong Province, China that is renowned for the preservation of its historical buildings dating to the Ming and Qing Dynasties. The village is located about 45 km to the east of the provincial capital Jinan and falls under the administration of the county-level city of Zhangqiu.

References

External links
photos of the village

Villages in China
Jinan